Yuri Remmovich Melentiev (born 3 September 1964 in Frunze) is a Kyrgyz sport shooter. He competed in pistol shooting events at the Summer Olympics in 1996 and 2000.

His older brother, Alexander was also a sport shooter.

Olympic results

References

External links
 

1964 births
Living people
Sportspeople from Bishkek
ISSF pistol shooters
Kyrgyzstani people of Russian descent
Kyrgyzstani male sport shooters
Olympic shooters of Kyrgyzstan
Shooters at the 1996 Summer Olympics
Shooters at the 2000 Summer Olympics
Shooters at the 1994 Asian Games
Shooters at the 1998 Asian Games
Shooters at the 2002 Asian Games
Asian Games competitors for Kyrgyzstan